Mike Snider is a comedy writer whose work frequently appeared in Mad from 1981 to 2006. 

Snider's byline appeared in 179 separate issues.  This included 75 consecutive issues from 1997 to 2003, thanks to his long-running recurring feature "Celebrity Cause-of-Death Betting Odds", which predicted the likeliest versions of future demise for a variety of well-known personalities.

References

External links 
 

American comedy writers
American comics writers
American satirists
American parodists
Living people
Mad (magazine) people
Year of birth missing (living people)